Kherla or Kherlá may refer to several places within the Republic of India:

 Kherla, Madhya Pradesh, a town near Betul, Madhya Pradesh
 Kingdom of Kherla, a medieval and early modern Gond kingdom based there
 Kherla Sarkar, a former name of Betul District
 Kherla, Haryana
 Kherla Bujurg, Rajasthan
 Kherla Gadali, Rajasthan